

The Pasped W-1 Skylark is a 1930s American two-seat single-engined cabin monoplane designed and built by the Pasped Aircraft Company of Glendale, California.

Design and development
The Skylark is a braced low-wing monoplane with a fixed tailwheel landing gear. It is powered by a  Warner Scarab radial engine. The enclosed cockpit has side-by-side seating for two. It has a welded steel fuselage and wooden wings. With other two-seat aircraft of the era having a better performance on smaller engines the Skylark did not enter production. The sole example was currently airworthy in February 2010 with an owner in Versailles, Missouri.

Specifications

References

Notes

Bibliography

1930s United States civil utility aircraft
Low-wing aircraft
Single-engined tractor aircraft
Aircraft first flown in 1935